Hemineura may refer to:
 Hemineura (insect), a genus of insects in the family Elipsocidae
 Hemineura (alga), a genus of algae in the family Delessiaceae